Alucita eudasys is a moth of the family Alucitidae. It was described by Alexey Diakonoff in 1954. It is found in New Guinea.

References

Moths described in 1954
Alucitidae
Moths of New Guinea
Taxa named by Alexey Diakonoff